The Nankin Bantam or Nankin is a British bantam breed of chicken. It is a true bantam, a naturally small breed with no large counterpart from which it was miniaturised. It is of South-east Asian origin, and is among the oldest bantam breeds. It is a yellowish buff colour, and the name is thought to derive from the colour of nankeen cotton from China.

History 

The Nankin is thought to be one of the oldest true bantam breeds, originating somewhere in Southeast Asia. Though they first became widespread in the West only in the 18th century, there is evidence for their presence in England going back to the 16th century. As a bantam long present in the UK especially, the Nankin contributed to the formation of many other bantams more common today, such as the Sebright. Nankin are listed as 'Critical' on the endangered chicken breeds list of the Livestock Conservancy. They are very rarely found in the USA.

The number of Nankins declined in the West after the mid 19th century, along with the importation of newer and more exotic Asian breeds. Though their popularity with poultry fanciers waned, the use of broody Nankin hens to incubate game bird eggs may have kept the breed from disappearing altogether. 
 
Interest in Nankins in North America largely sprung out of attention from the American Bantam Association in the 1960s. Today, Nankins are recognised by the American Bantam Association, and have been accepted into the American Poultry Association's Standard of Perfection as of 2012. A US breed club was formed for the first time in 2006. They are classified as critically endangered by the American Livestock Breeds Conservancy.

In 2002 the total number for the breed was estimated at 50–100 birds; the conservation status of the Nankin was listed by the FAO as "critical" in 2007. In 2017, the Nankin was not among the "priority breeds" on the watchlist of the Rare Breeds Survival Trust.

 Nankins were originally from South-East Asia but have been bred in the UK for a very long time, possibly as long as 500 years, so are regarded as a native breed by the RBST.
 About 1780 Sir John Sebright included Nankins as one of the breeds he used to make his Gold Sebright Bantams, and other breeders used Nankins to make Buff Orpington and Plymouth Rock bantams.
 There was however some loss of their characteristic jaunty style and an increase in their size.
 Andrew Sheppy came across Mrs Peters birds and this ensured the survival of the breed.
 Since the 1980s there have been rather more people breeding them and a concerted effort to get them back to type of Mrs Cross’s birds seen in that one photo taken in 1921.
https://www.rbst.org.uk/nankin

Characteristics 

The breed has two varieties, differentiated by comb type; the single comb Nankin has a large comb with five points, and the rose comb has a medium size one ending in a single point. All Nankins come in a single colour, with buff on the body and black tails. The golden hue is deeper and more lustrous in males, and they have the longer sickle feathers common in cocks. Their beaks are a light horn colour, and legs are slate blue.

Use 

The Nankin is usually reared for fancy and exhibition. The hens lay well, and are good sitters. Their eggs are very small and a creamy white colour. As with some other bantam breeds, broody Nankin hens were traditionally used to incubate the eggs of game birds such as pheasant, quail and partridge. The breed matures slowly, and makes a poor meat producer.

References 

Conservation Priority Breeds of the Livestock Conservancy
Bantam chicken breeds
Chicken breeds
Animal breeds on the RBST Watchlist